Aleksandr Akondinov (born 30 August 1891, date of death unknown) was a Russian Empire wrestler. He competed in the featherweight event at the 1912 Summer Olympics.

References

External links
 

1891 births
Year of death missing
Olympic wrestlers from the Russia Empire
Wrestlers at the 1912 Summer Olympics
Russian male sport wrestlers
Sportspeople from Saint Petersburg